Hartmut Fähndrich (born 14 October 1944) is a German scholar and translator, specialising in translation of Arabic literature into German. He was born in Tübingen and studied at the universities of Tübingen, Münster, and UCLA. He obtained an MA in comparative literature and a PhD in Islamic studies from UCLA. In 1972, he moved to Switzerland where he has lived ever since. He has taught at the University of Bern and the Swiss Federal Institute of Technology in Zürich.

Fähndrich has translated more than 50 book-length works and numerous other shorter pieces. His first translated work was Wild Thorns (German title: Der Feigenkaktus) by Sahar Khalifeh in 1983. Since then he has translated books by many of the most important Arabic writers, from Naguib Mahfouz to Alaa al-Aswany. A partial list of these writers is provided below; the full list can be found here (PDF).

Fähndrich has received numerous awards for his work, including several from the city of Bern, one from the Arab League in 2004, from Egypt's Supreme Council of Culture in 2006, and the Saudi King Abdullah International Award for Translation in 2009, the world's richest translation prize. Of the Saudi award, Fähndrich said that only a fraction of the prize money he was supposed to have shared with an Arab colleague has arrived so far (as of October 2012), Fähndrich said "I feel I've been cheated". Fähndrich was also a member of the IPAF jury in 2008.

Translated authors
 Abdel Hakim Qasem
 Abdelkader al-Janabi
 Abdelrahman Munif
 Alaa al-Aswany
 Azmi Bishara
 Edwar al-Kharrat
 Emile Habiby
 Emily Nasrallah
 Gamal al-Ghitani
 Ghassan Kanafani
 Hamida Naana
 Hanan al-Shaykh
 Hassan Daoud
 Hassan Nasr
 Ibrahim al-Koni
 Iman Humaydan-Yunus
 Khaled Ziadeh
 Latifa al-Zayyat
 May Telmissany
 Mohammad al-Bisatie
 Muhammad al-Machsangi
 Muhammad Mustagab
 Naguib Mahfouz
 Rashid al-Daif
 Sahar Khalifeh
 Salwa Bakr
 Sinan Antoon
 Sonallah Ibrahim
 Yahya Taher Abdullah
 Yusuf Idris
 Zakaria Tamer

External links
 Official website

References

1944 births
German translators
German–Arabic translators
Living people
People from Tübingen
German male non-fiction writers